Bandar Tasik Selatan station (BTS) is a major Malaysian interchange station located next to and named after Bandar Tasik Selatan, in Kuala Lumpur. The station serves as both a stop and an interchange for the KTM Komuter's Seremban Line, KTM ETS, the LRT Sri Petaling Line, and the Express Rail Link's KLIA Transit trains.  BTS is integrated with the Terminal Bersepadu Selatan bus hub (TBS). BTS and TBS are developed as an intermodal transportation hub.

Facilities for the reloading of Touch 'n Go cards are also provided in the interchange, at the Sri Petaling Line concourse.

Location
BTS is located approximately 10 km south of the Kuala Lumpur city centre, towards the Kuala Lumpur International Airport. The location of BTS and TBS provides easy access to Malaysia's motorway network, avoiding city centre road congestion.

Lines
The interchange is made out of three different lines. They were laid side by side and added over the course of seven years. Overhead bridges connect all three lines. Each line has separate, independent service features and ticketing areas. The paid areas of each line are distinct from each other, therefore there is no paid-area integration between the three lines, and passengers have to purchase new tickets (or tokens in the case of the LRT and KTM stations) when exiting one line to change to the other.

All three lines in the interchange accommodate for disabled passengers.

Seremban Line (KTM Komuter) and KTM ETS

The Bandar Tasik Selatan station was formed with the completion of a KTM Komuter regional rail halt, as part of the second phase of the electrified Rawang-Seremban Line (between Kuala Lumpur and Kajang) opening on 10 November 1995. The station was the first in the stop to be accessible from Kuala Lumpur Middle Ring Road 2 (MRR2), but its facilities were rudimentary, consisting of only two raised side platforms lined along a curved double track, a footbridge, and an elevated ticket area that initially provided only ticket vending machines. The platform shelters were only sufficient for a limited space, and the halt often suffered from bottlenecking at the ticket area. The various levels of the halt were also initially linked primarily via staircases or escalators, rendering the halt unfriendly to disabled users.

In 2006 and 2007, renovation works were made to expand the ticket area of the halt, and add a larger concourse area with a manual ticket counter. In addition, existing shelters along the platforms were replaced by large canopies during the middle of 2007, in conjunction with 2006 and 2007 canopy upgrades at most Komuter stations built or upgraded circa 1995.

On 4 August 2016, an additional morning train (Mondays to Fridays except on public holidays) was introduced between Bandar Tasik Selatan, KL Sentral and Tanjung Malim. The train starts at Bandar Tasik Selatan at 5:35am, running non-stop express to KL Sentral, arriving at 5:49am. The train then leaves KL Sentral at 6:15am and runs as a normal Port Klang Line train to Tanjung Malim, stopping at every station before terminating at Tanjung Malim at 7:44am. This has since been replaced with modifications to the KTM Komuter timetable.

The station provides both KTM Komuter and the KTM ETS services.

LRT Sri Petaling Line

The second addition to the stop is a subsurface light rapid transit station for the Sri Petaling-Sentul Timur branch of the Ampang Line, then known as STAR LRT. The station was opened on 11 July 1998, as part of the second phase of the STAR system's opening, including 7 new stations along the Chan Sow Lin-Sri Petaling route, and was situated directly southeast from the Komuter halt and closer to MRR2. At that time, BTS station was named as "Tasik Selatan" station. Because of the layout, the Komuter halt was initially accessible solely via the main entrance of the then Ampang Line station, which currently serves as the southeastern access point into the interchange station.

In comparison to the Komuter halt during its time of opening, the STAR station was considerably more capable of handling larger numbers of passengers, with several ticket counters and ticket vending machines prepared in its ticket concourse when the station was unveiled to commuters. The station also features an island platform for its two adjoining tracks, instead of side platforms. Both segments of the station are linked by a footbridge, which, like the initial KTM halt, did not accommodate disabled passengers as the footbridge is only accessible via staircases. This has since changed when lifts were added to both the KTM and LRT stations.

The principal styling of the station is similar to most other stations along the Ampang and Sri Petaling lines, featuring multi-tiered roofs supported by latticed frames, and white plastered walls and pillars. Signboards in the station formerly referred to itself simply as "Tasek Selatan".

KLIA Transit (Express Rail Link)

The Bandar Tasik Selatan Express Rail Link station is the latest stop added to the Bandar Tasik Selatan interchange, beginning its operation on 20 June 2002 as part of the 5-station KLIA Transit airport rail link between the Kuala Lumpur International Airport station and Kuala Lumpur Sentral.

Rather than sharing a common access point with the KTM station and the Sri Petaling Line station, the KLIA Transit station was constructed as an entirely dedicated structure towards the northwest from the KTM station, with its own access point towards the northwest via Kampung Malaysia Tambahan to Jalan Sungai Besi (a branch road from the Sungai Besi Expressway). The only direct linkage between the KLIA Transit station and the other two stations is a 95-metre footbridge over the ERL tracks and the KTM tracks into the ticket area of the KTM station, thus serving as a second access point to both the KTM station and the Sri Petaling Line station.

The station was built in a unique design that incorporated large semicircular roofs as shelters for platforms with multi-tiered roofs for the rest of the building, similar to the adjoining Sri Petaling Line station. Unlike the initial structures of the KTM and LRT stations, however, the station was planned and built to support disabled passengers, with elevators and inclinations up and down uneven walkways, alongside stairways and escalators in all relevant areas of the station. The station also features two island platforms along four tracks, and basic ticket counters.

Station Layout

Terminal Bersepadu Selatan

Terminal Bersepadu Selatan (TBS) is the main long-distance bus terminal in Kuala Lumpur, Malaysia. It is integrated with the adjacent Bandar Tasik Selatan station (BTS) via a footbridge,  forming the TBS-BTS integrated transportation hub.

TBS is one of the three planned Integrated Transport Terminals (ITT) of Kuala Lumpur, and the only one currently in operation. Originally intended to be the bus terminal serving southbound buses, TBS gradually took over bus operations for East Coast-bound and northbound buses from older city bus terminals. The other two ITTs, located at Gombak and Sungai Buloh, are in planning stages and will eventually become the main bus terminals for East Coast-bound and northbound buses respectively.

History
TBS was built to relieve the heavily congested Pudu Sentral bus station (formerly and still commonly known as Puduraya) located in the city centre. Initially planned to be the bus station serving southbound express buses, the long-term plan was TBS eventually taking over the remaining express buses at Pudu Sentral, as well as East Coast-bound buses at Hentian Putra and Pekeliling bus stations. It was expected that Pudu Sentral would remain as a city bus station only.

TBS opened for service on 1 January 2011, taking over southbound long-distance bus operations from Pudu Sentral. The ceremonial official opening by the Prime Minister Najib Tun Razak was on 14 April 2013.

Hentian Putra ceased operations on 1 December 2014, with its East Coast-bound bus services moved to TBS.

On 1 November 2015, 545 of the 635 northbound bus operations at Pudu Sentral were moved to TBS, completing the replacement of Pudu Sentral by TBS as the city's main express bus terminal. Pudu Sentral remains in use as a terminal for short-distance buses and stage buses.

Location and facilities

TBS is located approximately 10 km south of Kuala Lumpur city centre relieving and bypassing road congestion in the city centre. The proximity of TBS to the Middle Ring Road 2 and Besraya Expressway gives easy access to Malaysia's expressway network.

The terminal has 60 bus platforms, 150 taxi bays and 1,000 parking bays. The terminal is fully accessible and equipped with amenities such as ATMs, baby care rooms, luggage trolleys and luggage storage. Shopping and dining options are available.

The terminal ticketing facilities feature:-

 41 Centralised Ticketing System (CTS) counters manned by staff from the terminal operator Maju TMAS
 seven ticket vending machines.

The system is set up to deter touting.

The departure hall is divided into three sections. Only ticket holders are allowed into the departure hall. They are required to go through an auxiliary police security checkpoint.

Designed to handle 5,000 bus trips a day at maximum capacity, TBS handled about 1,300 bus trips daily as of October 2015, prior to the shift of northbound bus operations from Pudu Sentral. As of December 2015, the terminal serves 52,000 travellers per day.

Management
The current operator of TBS is Maju Terminal Management Services Sdn Bhd (Maju TMAS). Maju TMAS is a member company of Maju Holdings Berhad.

See also

 Transport in Malaysia

References

External links
 The official Terminal Bersepadu Selatan website

2011 establishments in Malaysia
Bus stations in Kuala Lumpur
Ampang Line
Express Rail Link
Railway stations in Kuala Lumpur
Rapid transit stations in Kuala Lumpur
Seremban Line